Chiayi Air Base is an air base of the Republic of China Air Force that is co-located with Chiayi Airport in Chiayi County, Taiwan. A number of US Air Force units have been stationed at Chiayi Air Base, including the 67th Fighter-Bomber Squadron from 27 January – 17 February 1955 and 1 July – 1 October 1955. 19 February – 1 March 1958, Reconnaissance Task Force KENTUCKY, Kentucky Air National Guard deployed to Taoyuan and Chiayi Air Bases. 4 March 1955, 310th Fighter-Bomber Squadron deployed from Osan Air Base, South Korea, to Chiayi Air Force Base for air defense missions.

Between January 1955 and July 1968, the 51st Fighter-Interceptor Wing and 18th Tactical Fighter Wing was temporary task assignments (TDY)  from Naha Air Base and Kadena Air Base in Okinawa, fighter jets are frequently rotated to Chiayi Air Base every 60-90 days.

Based units 
Republic of China Air Force
 4th Tactical Fighter Wing
 21st Tactical Fighter Group  – F-16V
 22nd Tactical Fighter Group   – F-16A/B Fighting Falcon
 23rd Tactical Fighter Group   – F-16A/B Fighting Falcon
Air Rescue Group – Sikorsky S-70C, UH-60M,  EC225 Super Puma
 4th Maintenance and Supply Group
 4th Base Service Group
 4th Military police Squadron

References

United States military in Taiwan
Military installations of the Republic of China
Buildings and structures in Chiayi County
Transportation in Chiayi County